Small and medium-sized enterprises (SMEs) or small and medium-sized businesses (SMBs) are businesses whose personnel and revenue numbers fall below certain limits. The abbreviation "SME" is used by international organizations such as the World Bank, the European Union, the United Nations, and the World Trade Organization (WTO).

In any given national economy, SMEs sometimes outnumber large companies by a wide margin and also employ many more people.
For example, Australian SMEs makeup 98% of all Australian businesses, produce one-third of the total GDP (gross domestic product) and employ 4.7 million people. In Chile, in the commercial year 2014, 98.5% of the firms were classified as SMEs. In Tunisia, the self-employed workers alone account for about 28% of the total non-farm employment, and firms with fewer than 100 employees account for about 62% of total employment. The United States' SMEs generate half of all U.S. jobs, but only 40% of GDP.

Developing countries tend to have a larger share of small and medium-sized enterprises. SMEs are also responsible for driving innovation and competition in many economic sectors. Although they create more new jobs than large firms, SMEs also suffer the majority of job destruction/contraction.

Overview 

SMEs are important for economic and social reasons, given the sector's role in employment. Due to their sizes, SMEs are heavily influenced by their Chief Executive Officer, a.k.a. CEOs. The CEOs of SMEs are often the founders, owners, and managers of the SMEs. The duties of the CEO in a SME mirror those of the CEO of a large company: the CEO needs to strategically allocate their time, energy, and assets to direct the SMEs. Typically, the CEO is the strategist, champion and leader for developing the SME or the prime reason for the business failing.

This definition is provided in Section 7 of Micro, Small & Medium Enterprises Development  Act, 2006 (MSMED Act) and was notified in September 2006. The Act provides for the classification of enterprises based on their investment size and the nature of the activity undertaken by that enterprise. As per MSMED Act, enterprises are classified into two categories - manufacturing enterprises and service enterprises. For each of these categories, a definition is given to explain what constitutes a micro-enterprise or a small enterprise or a medium enterprise. In India, if an enterprise does not fall under the above categories, it would be considered a large-scale enterprise.

At the employee level, Petrakis and Kostis (2012) explore the role of interpersonal trust and knowledge in the number of small and medium enterprises. They conclude that knowledge positively affects the number of SMEs, which in turn positively affects interpersonal trust. Note that the empirical results indicate that interpersonal trust does not affect the number of SMEs. Therefore, although knowledge development can reinforce SMEs, trust becomes widespread in a society when the number of SMEs is greater.

Legal boundary on SMEs around the world 
Multilateral organizations have been criticized for using one measure for all. The legal boundary of SMEs around the world vary, and below is a list of the upper limits of SMEs in some countries.

Africa 
African small businesses frequently struggle to get the cash they require to thrive. According to the SME Finance Forum, the formal financing gap for African SMEs averaged 17% of GDP across the 43 countries assessed in 2017.

According to the World Bank, women own 58% of all MSMEs in Africa.

The European Investment Bank's Banking in Africa survey, 2021 suggests that most of the responding banks had a non-performing loan (NPL) ratio of at least 5%. NPLs account for at least 10% of the SME portfolio in approximately one-third of African banks. Furthermore, 50% of the banks had at least 5% of their SME portfolio under the moratorium, and 40% had at least 5% of SME loans under some type of restructuring.

Egypt 
Most of Egypt's businesses are small-sized, with 97 percent employing fewer than 10 workers, according to census data released by state-run statistics body CAPMAS (Central Agency for Public Mobilization and Statistics).

Medium-sized enterprises with 10 to 50 employees account for around 2.7 percent of total businesses. However, big businesses with over 50 employees account for 0.4 percent of all enterprises nationwide.

The data is part of Egypt's 2012/13 economic census on establishments ranging from small stalls to big enterprises. Economic activity outside the establishments – like street vendors and farmers, for example – were excluded from the census.

The results show that Egypt is greatly lacking in medium-sized businesses.

Seventy percent of the country's 24 million businesses have only one or two employees. But less than 0.1 percent – only 784 businesses – employ between 45 and 49 people.

Kenya 
In Kenya, the term changed to MSME, which stands for "micro, small, and medium-sized enterprises".

For micro-enterprises, the minimum number of employees is up to 10 employees. For small enterprises, it is from 10 to 50. For medium enterprises, it is from 50 to 100.

Nigeria 
The Central Bank of Nigeria defines small and medium enterprises in Nigeria according to asset base and a number of staff employed. The criteria are an asset base that is between ₦5 million ($15,400) to ₦500 million ($1,538,000), and a staff strength that is between 11 and 100 employees.

Somalia 
In Somalia, the term is SME (for "small, medium, and micro enterprises"); elsewhere in Africa, MSME stands for "micro, small, and medium enterprises". An SME is defined as a small business that has more than 30 employees but less than 250 employees.

South Africa 
In the National Small Business Amendment Act 2004, micro-businesses in the different sectors, varying from the manufacturing to the retail sectors, are defined as businesses with five or fewer employees and a turnover of up to R100,000 ZAR ($6,900). Very small businesses employ between 6 and 20 employees, while small businesses employ between 21 and 50 employees. The upper limit for turnover in a small business varies from R1 million ($69,200) in the agricultural sector to R13 million ($899,800) in the catering, accommodations and other trade sectors as well as in the manufacturing sector, with a maximum of R32 million ($2,214,800) in the wholesale trade sector.

Medium-sized businesses usually employ up to 200 people (100 in the agricultural sector), and the maximum turnover varies from R5 million ($346,100) in the agricultural sector to R51 ($3,529,800) million in the manufacturing sector and R64 ($4,429,600) million in the wholesale trade, commercial agents and allied services  sector.

A comprehensive definition of an SME in South Africa is, therefore, an enterprise with one or more of the following characteristics: 
 Fewer than 200 employees,
 Annual turnover of less than R64 million,
 Capital assets of less than R10 million,
 Direct managerial involvement by owners

Asia

Hong Kong
Hong Kong defines Small and Medium Enterprises (SMEs) as any manufacturing business that employs less than 100 people or any non-manufacturing business that employs less than 50 people.

98% of business establishments in Hong Kong are defined as SMEs and employed 45% of the work force.

India 
India defines Micro, Small and Medium Enterprises based on dual criteria of investment and turnover. In June 2020, India updated the definition as follows:

Businesses that are declared as MSMEs and within specific sectors and criteria can then apply for "priority sector" lending to help with business expenses; banks have annual targets set by the Prime Minister's Task Force on MSMEs for year-on-year increases of lending to various categories of MSMEs. MSME is considered a key contributor to India's growth and contributes 48% to India's total export.

Indonesia 

In Indonesia, the government defines micro, small, and medium enterprises (Indonesian: usaha mikro kecil menengah, UMKM) based on their assets and revenues according to Law No. 20/2008:

An annual revenue of Rp 50 billion is approximately equal to US$3.7 million as of November 2017.

Bangladesh 

In Bangladesh, Bangladesh Bank defines Small and medium enterprises based on fixed asset, employed manpower and yearly turn over, and they are definitely not Public Limited Co.  and requires these characteristics -

Philippines

According to the Department of Trade and Industry's 2020 List of Establishments report, there are 957,620 registered business enterprises operating in the country, composed of 99.51% MSMEs and 0.49% large firms. The MSMEs consist of 88.77% microenterprises, 10.25% small enterprises, and 0.49% medium enterprises. Among the top industry sectors include (1) wholesale and retail trade; repair of motor vehicles and motorcycles (445,386); (2) accommodation and food service activities (134,046); (3) manufacturing (110,916); (4) other service activities (62,376); and (5) financial and insurance activities (45,558) which accounted for about 83.77% of the total number of MSME establishments. Prior to the pandemic, MSMEs generated more than 5.38 million jobs or 62.66% of the country's total employment with a 29.38% share from micro-enterprises followed by 25.78% and 7.50% for small and medium enterprises.

Singapore 

With effect from 1 April 2011, the definition of SMEs is businesses with annual sales turnover of not more than $100 million or employing no more than 200 staff.

Europe

European Union 

Small companies are important to the European economy as they account for 99.8% of non-financial enterprises in the European Union (EU) and employ two-thirds of the workforce in the EU. The majority of European firms are small and medium-sized enterprises (SMEs), employing over 100 million people. Due to the COVID-19 pandemic, a large majority of SMEs saw a decline in revenue during 2020-2021.

The pandemic has had a greater impact on SMEs than on large businesses, with an average sales loss of 26% versus 23% for large businesses. Government assistance appears to have benefited SMEs more than large corporations among the companies that do have overdraft facilities, indicating a successful application of policies to ease financial limitations for SMEs even when they receive help from the banking sector.

SMEs were more quick in altering output during the pandemic, despite the intensity of the shock. In reaction to the crisis, one-third of major enterprises altered their output or services, compared to 37% of SMEs.

Large businesses, on the other hand, embraced digitization to a greater extent than small businesses, with 26% boosting their online distribution of products and services, compared to 22% for SMEs. The most significant difference in adaption measures was shown in the chance of expanding remote work, which increased by 25% among SMEs but 50% among large businesses.

The criteria for defining the size of a business differ from country to country, with many countries having programs of business rate reduction and financial subsidy for SMEs. According to the European Commission, SMEs are enterprises which meet the following definition of staff headcount and either the turnover or balance sheet total definitions:

In July 2011, the European Commission said it would open a consultation on the definition of SMEs in 2012. A consultation document was issued on 6 February 2018 and the consultation period closed on 6 May 2018. , no conclusions or responses have yet emerged.

In Europe, there are three broad parameters that define SMEs:
 Micro-enterprises have up to 10 employees
 Small enterprises have up to 50 employees
 Medium-sized enterprises have up to 250 employees.
The European definition of SME follows: "The category of micro, small and medium-sized enterprises (SMEs) is made up of enterprises which employ fewer than 250 persons and which have an annual turnover not exceeding 50 million euro, and/or an annual balance sheet total not exceeding 43 million euro." In order to prepare for an evaluation and revision of some features of the small and medium-sized enterprises definition European Union established public consultation period from 6 February 2018 to 6 May 2018. Public consultation is available for all EU member country citizens and organizations. Especially, national and regional authorities, enterprises, business associations or organizations, venture capital providers, research and academic institutions, and individual citizens are expected as the main contributors.

EU member states have had individual definitions of what constitutes an SME. For example, the definition in Germany had a limit of 255 employees, while in Belgium it could have been 100. The result is that while a Belgian business of 249 employees would be taxed at full rate in Belgium, it would nevertheless be eligible for SME subsidy under a European-labelled programme.

SMEs are a crucial element in the supplier network of large enterprises which are already on their way towards Industry 4.0.
According to German economist Hans-Heinrich Bass, "empirical research on SME as well as policies to promote SME have a long tradition in [West] Germany, dating back into the 19th century. Until the mid-20th century, most researchers considered SME as an impediment to further economic development and SME policies were thus designed in the framework of social policies. Only the Ordoliberalism school, the founding fathers of Germany's social market economy, discovered their strengths, considered SME as a solution to mid-20th century economic problems (mass unemployment, abuse of economic power), and laid the foundations for non-selective (functional) industrial policies to promote SMEs." Only around 20% of European SMEs are substantially digitalized, compared to almost 50% of major businesses.  Small and medium-sized companies make up 56.2% of the non-financial sector.

Smaller companies account for more than 60% of the value contributed to the non-financial sector in Belgium, Italy, and Spain, three of the nations worst hit by the COVID-19 pandemic. An estimated 50% of Europe's small firms may fail because they lack the substantial financial reserves required to weather the crisis.

The results of an EU survey conducted in 2021 suggest that during the pandemic, in countries with larger fiscal packages, SMEs were on average more likely to experience bankruptcy even after controlling for the size of the shock, the use of bank financing, and country and sector fixed effects. When policy assistance rises by 1% of GDP, the probabilities of bankruptcy for a SME are 2.7 times higher than for a non-SME. Credit limitations are especially difficult for SMEs and new businesses to overcome. Credit constraints affect 24% of SMEs and 27% of young businesses.

Poland 
The SME sector in Poland generates almost 50% of the GDP, and out of that, for instance, in 2011, micro companies generated 29.6%, small companies 7.7%, and medium companies 10.4% (big companies 24.0%; other entities 16.5%, and revenues from customs duties and taxes generated 11.9%). In 2011, out of the total of 1,784,603 entities operating in Poland, merely 3,189 were classified as "large", so 1,781,414 were micro, small, or medium. SMEs employed 6.3 million people out of the total of 9.0 million of labour employed in the private sector. In Poland in 2011 there were 36.2 SMEs per 1,000 inhabitants.

Nearly seven million people are employed by small businesses in Poland, which accounts for around half of the country's GDP, yet smaller businesses are less likely than larger ones to invest in strategies to combat climate change or boost energy efficiency. In October 2021, the Bank Ochrony rodowiska, a Polish bank that specializes in funding environmental protection initiatives received €75 million from the European Investment Bank (EIB) for these small enterprises.

The Polish bank wants to use at least 50% of the loan for initiatives with a clear emphasis on tackling climate change, such improving building energy efficiency or turning to renewable energy sources like solar power. The money is set to be distributed across Poland, with around 80% of it projected to go to cohesive regions.

United Kingdom 
In the United Kingdom (UK), a company is defined as being an SME if it meets two out of three criteria: it has a turnover of less than £25m, it has fewer than 250 employees, it has gross assets of less than £12.5m. Very small companies are called in the UK micro-entities, which have simpler financial reporting requirements. Such micro-enterprises must meet any two of the following criteria: balance sheet £316,000 or less; turnover £632,000 or less; employees 10 or less.

Many small and medium-sized businesses form part of the UK's currently growing , or Brittelstand as it is also sometimes named. These are businesses in Britain that are not only small or medium but also have a much broader set of values and more elastic definition.

The Department for Business Innovation and Skills estimated that at the start of 2014, 99.3% of UK private sector businesses were SMEs, with their £1.6 trillion annual turnover accounting for 47% of private sector turnover.

In order to support SMEs, the UK government set a target in 2010 "that 25% of government’s spend, either directly or in supply chains, goes to SMEs by 2015"; it achieved this by 2013.

Norway 

In Norway it is normal to design small and medium-sized businesses as businesses with less than 100 employees. Businesses with 1-20 employees are defined as small, while businesses with 21-100 employees are considered medium-sized. Businesses with more than 100 employees would be considered a big business. Micro-sized businesses is a little used expression in Norway.NHO

Small and medium-sized businesses make up more than 99% of all businsesses in Norway, and together they employ 47% of all employees in the private sector. Together, SMEs account for 44% of the economic value added each year - almost 700 billion Norwegian Kroners (NOK).Fakta om små og mellomstore bedrifter (SMB)

Switzerland 

In Switzerland, the Federal Statistical Office defines small and medium-sized enterprises as companies with less than 250 employees. The categories are the following:
 Microentreprises: 1 to 9 employees
 Small enterprises: 10 to 49 employees
 Medium-sized enterprises: 50 to 249  employees
 Large enterprises: 250 employees or more

North America

Canada 
Industry Canada defines a small business as one with fewer than 100 paid employees, and a medium-sized business as one with at least 100 and fewer than 500 employees.  As of December 2012, there were 1,107,540 employer businesses in Canada of the rally .  Canadian controlled private corporations receive a 17% reduction in the tax rate on taxable income from active businesses up to $500,000.  This small business deduction is reduced for corporations whose taxable capital exceeds $10M and is eliminated for corporations whose taxable capital exceeds $15M.  It has been estimated that almost $2 trillion of Canadian SMEs will be coming up for sale over the next decade, which is twice as large as the assets of the top 1,000 Canadian pension plans and approximately the same size as Canadian annual GDP.

Mexico 
The small and medium-sized companies in Mexico are called PYMEs, which is a direct translation of SMEs. But there's another categorization in the country called MiPyMEs. The MiPyMEs are micro, small and medium-sized businesses, with an emphasis on micro which are one man companies or a type of freelance.

United States 
In the United States, the Small Business Administration sets small business criteria based on industry, ownership structure, revenue and number of employees (which in some circumstances may be as high as 1500, although the cap is typically 500).
Both the US and the EU generally use the same threshold of fewer than 10 employees for small offices (SOHO).

Oceania

Australia 

In Australia, a SME has 200 or fewer employees. Micro Businesses have 1–4 employees, small businesses 5–19, medium businesses 20–199, and large businesses 200+. Australian SMEs make up 98% of all Australian businesses, produce one-third of total GDP, and employ 4.7 million people. SMEs represent 90 per cent of all goods exporters and over 60% of services exporters.

New Zealand 
In New Zealand, 99% of businesses employ 50 or less staff, and the official definition of a small business is one with 19 or fewer employees. It is estimated that approximately 28% of New Zealand's gross domestic product is produced by companies with fewer than 20 employees.

See also 
 Confédération Européenne des Associations de Petites et Moyennes Entreprises (CEA-PME), an international federation of SME associations
 Environmental regulation of small and medium enterprises
 Hidden champions
 Mittelstand
 Small and medium enterprises in Mexico
 Small business

References

External links 

 SMEs and Entrepreneurship at the OECD
 SME definition by European Commission
 Small Business Expo Events Schedule USA

 
Companies by type